CBSL may refer to:

Cystathionine beta synthase, a gene
Central Bank of Sri Lanka